= Erfurter Landkurier =

Erfurter Landkurier ('Erfurt Country Courier') was a newspaper published from Erfurt, German Democratic Republic 1960–1961. It functioned as the organ of the District Leadership of the Socialist Unity Party of Germany for Kreis Erfurt-Land. Publishing began in December 1960. In 1961 the newspaper was succeeded by Erfurter Wochenzeitung.
